Anibál Filiberti (31 March 1914 – 17 February 1998) was an Argentine water polo player who competed in the 1948 Summer Olympics.

References

External links
 

1914 births
1998 deaths
Sportspeople from Rosario, Santa Fe
Argentine male water polo players
Olympic water polo players of Argentina
Water polo players at the 1948 Summer Olympics